The former Fork Creek Wildlife Management Area was located on  in Boone County near Nellis, West Virginia. The steep terrain and narrow valleys are mostly covered with second-growth mixed hardwoods.

Originally established in 1960 with a lease from Armco Steel, the land was subsequently purchased by Island Creek Coal.  The WMA closed on July 31, 2008 as a result of mining in the area that severed the access road into the area.

Hunting and fishing

Fishing opportunities were limited by the small size of the stream.  Available hunting included deer, fox, grouse,  squirrel, turkey and raccoon.

See also
Animal conservation
Fishing
Hunting
List of West Virginia wildlife management areas

References

External links
 West Virginia DNR District 5 Wildlife Management Areas
West Virginia Hunting Regulations
West Virginia Fishing Regulations

Wildlife management areas of West Virginia
Geography of Boone County, West Virginia